The 2012 Winston-Salem Open was a tennis tournament played on outdoor hard courts. It was the 44th edition of the Winston-Salem Open, and was part of the ATP World Tour 250 Series of the 2012 ATP World Tour. It took place at the Wake Forest University in Winston-Salem, North Carolina, United States, from August 19 through August 25, 2012. It was the last event on the 2012 US Open Series before the 2012 US Open. John Isner won the singles title.

Singles main-draw entrants

Seeds

 Seedings are based on the rankings of August 13, 2012

Other entrants
The following players received wildcards into the singles main draw:
  Tomáš Berdych
  James Blake
  Ryan Harrison
  David Nalbandian

The following players received entry from the qualifying draw:
  Benjamin Becker
  Ernests Gulbis 
  Michael McClune
  Sergiy Stakhovsky

Withdrawals
  Gaël Monfils (knee injury)

Retirements
  Marcos Baghdatis (lower back injury)

Doubles main-draw entrants

Seeds

 Rankings are as of August 13, 2012

Other entrants
The following pair received wildcard into the doubles main draw:
  Jonathan Erlich /  Andy Ram
The following pair received entry as alternates:
  Pablo Andújar /  Leonardo Mayer

Withdrawals
  Marcos Baghdatis (lower back injury)

Retirements
  Nicolas Mahut (knee injury)

Finals

Singles

 John Isner defeated  Tomáš Berdych, 3–6, 6–4, 7–6(11–9)
 It was Isner's 2nd title of the year and 5th of his career.

Doubles

 Santiago González /  Scott Lipsky defeated  Pablo Andújar /  Leonardo Mayer, 6–3, 4–6, [10–2]
 It was Gonzalez's 2nd title of the year and 5th of his career. It was Lipsky's 2nd title of the year and 8th of his career. As a team, it was their 2nd title of the year and 3rd of their career together.

References

External links
Official website

2012 ATP World Tour
2012 US Open Series
2012 in American tennis
August 2012 sports events in the United States
2012